John William Raymond (born April 30, 1962) is a retired United States Space Force general who served as the first chief of space operations from 2019 to 2022. The first guardian, he served as commander of the United States Space Command from 2019 to 2020.

Raised in a military family, Raymond was commissioned into the United States Air Force in 1984 after graduating from Clemson University. A career missile and space operations officer, he has commanded the 5th Space Surveillance Squadron, 30th Operations Group, Fourteenth Air Force, Joint Force Space Component Command, and Air Force Space Command. He has been deployed to serve in the War in Afghanistan and the Iraq War.

In 2016, Raymond assumed command of the Air Force Space Command and, in 2019, assumed additional duties as unified combatant command commander following the reestablishment of the U.S. Space Command. When the U.S. Space Force was established, he became the first chief of space operations. He also became the first member of the Space Force, ending his over 35 years of service in the Air Force.

For his work in leading the initial building of the Space Force, Raymond has been described as the "father of the Space Force". As the first chief of space operations, he oversaw the standup of new Space Force organizations, transfer of personnel from other military branches, consolidation of space units from other services, and setting its culture. He relinquished his post as chief of space operations in 2022 and retired from military service in 2023.

Early life and education
Born in Monterey County, California, and raised in Alexandria, Virginia, John William Raymond is the son of Barbara Ryan and retired United States Army Colonel John Allen Raymond (1935–2016). Since 1865, his family has had graduates from United States Military Academy in West Point, New York, including his great great grandfather, great grandfather, grandfather, and father. His great great grandfather, Army Brigadier General Charles Walker Raymond, graduated as the top cadet of his class in 1865. As an Army captain, civil engineer Charles Raymond commanded a delegation that went to Northern Tasmania to time the transit of Venus in December 1874. His father was a 1958 graduate of West Point, where he once taught astronomy.

Raymond graduated from Clemson University in 1984 with a B.S. degree in administrative management before he was commissioned in the United States Air Force. He later earned an M.S. degree from the Central Michigan University in 1990 and an M.A. degree in national security and strategic studies from the Naval War College in 2003. He also attended Squadron Officer School in 1990, Air Command and Staff College in 1997, and the Joint Forces Staff College in 2007. He also completed Air University's  Combined Force Air Component Commander Course and Joint Flag Officer Warfighting Course.

Military career

United States Air Force

Raymond was commissioned in the Air Force in 1984 as a second lieutenant following his graduation from Clemson University. The following year, he was assigned to the 321st Strategic Missile Wing as a missile combat crew commander at Grand Forks Air Force Base. From 1989 to 1993, Raymond was an operations center officer controller with the 1st Strategic Aerospace Division and executive officer of the 30th Space Wing at Vandenberg Air Force Base. In 1993, he was assigned to Air Force Space Command as chief of commercial space lift operations and assistant chief of current operations and, in 1996, as deputy director for commander-in-chief's action group.

In 1997, after attending Air Command and Staff College, Raymond was stationed at the Pentagon first as a space and missile Force programmer at the Air Force headquarters and then as chief of expeditionary aerospace force space and program integration. He remained there until 2000, at which time he assumed command of the 5th Space Surveillance Squadron located at RAF Feltwell in England. The following year, Raymond returned to the United States and became deputy commander of the 21st Operations Group. From 2002 to 2003, he studied at Naval War College. For two years after that, he was assigned as a transformation strategist to the Office of the United States Secretary of Defense. In 2005, he returned to Vandenberg Air Force Base and assumed command of the 30th Operations Group. He held that position until 2007, when he was named Commander of the 21st Space Wing.

In 2009, Raymond was reassigned to Air Force Space Command as director of plans, programs, and analyses. From December 2010 to July 2012, he served as vice commander of the Fifth Air Force and deputy commander of the Thirteenth Air Force at Yokota Air Base, Japan. From July 2012 to January 2014, he served as director of plans and policy of the United States Strategic Command at Offutt Air Force Base.

Raymond was promoted to lieutenant general on January 31, 2014, and assumed command of the Fourteenth Air Force and the Joint Functional Component Command for Space at Vandenberg. He replaced Lieutenant General Susan Helms who was retiring after her failed nomination as Air Force Space Command vice commander. He relinquished command to Lieutenant General David J. Buck on August 14, 2015, to return to the Pentagon and serve as the deputy chief of staff for operations of the U.S. Air Force.

Raymond was nominated for promotion to the rank of general and to the command of Air Force Space Command on September 8, 2016. This nomination was confirmed by the United States Senate on September 15. He assumed command of the Air Force Space Command on October 27, 2016, replacing John E. Hyten who was then tapped to become the commander of United States Strategic Command. On December 1, 2017, the Joint Functional Component Command for Space was restructured as the Joint Force Space Component Command and Raymond was dual-hatted as commander of the newly reorganized unit under U.S. Strategic Command.

United States Space Command

By 2018, plans were made to reestablish the United States Space Command and Raymond was tasked to plan for its standup. He asked five planners to help him plan such standup, including U.S. Army Brigadier General Thomas L. James and U.S. Air Force Brigadier General Shawn Bratton, and then-Brigadier General David N. Miller to lead a task force that did the detailed planning. On March 22, 2019, he was nominated to lead that unified combatant command, and was then confirmed by the United States Senate on June 27. He assumed command of the newly reestablished U.S. Space Command on August 29, 2019, while retaining command of Air Force Space Command.

Raymond is a proponent for declassifying space capabilities and intelligence as a way for deterring adversaries opening more dialogue about space threats. Along with Admiral Philip S. Davidson and seven other combatant commanders, he signed a memo—called informally as the "36-star memo"—addressed to the United States Intelligence Community that called for declassifying space-related intelligence.

In February 2020, Raymond called out Russia for "threatening behavior" in outer space, threatening a U.S. national security satellite. This was the first time the U.S. military has publicly identified a direct threat to a specific American satellite by an adversary.

While being the chief of the new military service, he continued serving as commander of the U.S. Space Command until August 20, 2020, when he relinquished command to his deputy, General James H. Dickinson. The National Defense Authorization Act for Fiscal Year 2020, which also created the Space Force, included a provision which allowed the chief of space operations to concurrently serve as commander of the combatant command for one year.

United States Space Force

When the creation of the Space Force or space corps was debated, Raymond initially did not support the idea of creating a separate space corps. In 2017, he wrote in a Defense One article that while he applauded the increased focus on space as a warfighting domain, what is needed instead is deeper integration and more resources. By April 2019, he reversed his position, supporting the Trump administration's proposal to establish the Space Force under the Department of the Air Force.

On December 20, 2019, the U.S. Space Force was established by redesignating the Air Force Space Command as a separate service. Raymond, then commander of Air Force Space Command, was appointed as the first chief of space operations. According to President Donald Trump, "With today's signing I will proudly appoint Gen. Jay Raymond the first chief of space operations and he will become the very first member of the Space Force and he will be on the Joint Chiefs." By becoming the first member of the Space Force, he left the Air Force after over 35 years of military service. He was officially sworn in by Vice President Mike Pence on January 14, 2020.

In November 2020, Raymond released the Chief of Space Operations' Planning Guidance where he outlined his five priorities as the service chief of the Space Force: building a lean and agile service, developing joint warfighters, delivering new capabilities, expand international cooperation, and creating a digital service. He also ordered the creation of the Space Warfighting Analysis Center and National Space Intelligence Center.

The law that created the Space Force stated that the chief of space operations will become a member of the Joint Chiefs of Staff only a year after its enactment, but Raymond was allowed to join the Joint Chiefs immediately because then-Secretary of Defense Mark Esper and Chairman of the Joint Chiefs of Staff Mark Milley viewed it important to national security. In December 2020, Raymond became an official member of the Joint Chiefs of Staff, his office becoming the 8th member of the Joint Chiefs. Together with other members of the Joint Chiefs of Staff, Raymond denounced the 2021 United States Capitol attack.

Raymond, and almost all the other Joint Chiefs of Staff members, went into quarantine in October 2020 after coming into contact with Admiral Charles Ray, who tested positive for COVID-19.

Raymond pushes for international norms of behavior for the space domain. Without those norms of behavior, he likened space as the "Wild, Wild West." This "rules of the road" for space is what he wants to pass on to his successors. In November 2021, he wrote an opinion piece for the Washington Post, detailing what the Space Force is doing to establish international norms and standards of behavior in space.

On November 2, 2022, Raymond transferred responsibility as chief of space operations to B. Chance Saltzman. During the ceremony, Secretary Frank Kendall III called Raymond the "father of the Space Force". He retired from active duty on January 1, 2023, after 38 years of service.

Personal life
Raymond is married to Mollie Raymond from Saint Paul, Minnesota, whom he met during his first assignment at Grand Forks Air Force Base, North Dakota and while she was studying at the University of North Dakota. They got married in June 1987 after Mollie graduated from college. They have three children.

Awards and decorations

Raymond is the recipient of the following awards:

2007 General Jerome F. O'Malley Distinguished Space Leadership Award, Air Force Association
2015 Thomas D. White Space Award, Air Force Association
2016 Peter B. Teets Government Award, National Defense Industrial Association
2017 James V. Hartinger Award, National Defense Industrial Association
2021 Henry “Hap” Arnold Award, Air Force Association

Dates of promotion

Writings

Op-eds

Journal articles

Thesis

References

External links

 
 

 

 
 

1962 births
Living people
Air Command and Staff College alumni
Central Michigan University alumni
Clemson University alumni
Joint Forces Staff College alumni
Naval War College alumni
Military personnel from Alexandria, Virginia
Recipients of the Defense Distinguished Service Medal
Recipients of the Air Force Distinguished Service Medal
Recipients of the Defense Superior Service Medal
Recipients of the Legion of Merit
Space force commanders
United States Air Force generals
Chiefs of Space Operations
United States Space Force generals